Sir Frederick Maurice Powicke  (1879–1963) was an English medieval historian. He was a fellow of Merton College, Oxford, a professor at Queen's University, Belfast and the Victoria University of Manchester, and from 1928 until his retirement Regius Professor at the University of Oxford. He was made a Knight Bachelor in 1946.

Life
Powicke was born on 16 June 1879 in Alnwick, the son of Frederick James Powicke, a Congregational minister and historian of 17th-century puritanism, and Martha, the youngest daughter of William Collyer of Brigstock. Powicke was educated at Owens College, Manchester, where he took his first degree, and at Balliol College, Oxford, where he took another with first-class honours.

From 1908 to 1915 he was a Fellow of Merton College, Oxford, although in 1909 he was appointed as Professor of Modern History in the Queen's University, Belfast, where he remained for ten years. From 1919 to 1928 he was Professor of Mediæval History at the Victoria University of Manchester, and during his time in Manchester he was a member of the Chetham Society and served on its council from 1920 to 1933. He also served as Ford's Lecturer in English History at Oxford for 1927. In 1928 he became Regius Professor of Modern History at Oxford, remaining in post until 1947. He was President of the Royal Historical Society from 1933 to 1937.

He was a tough, difficult man, small in build. At Oxford, he was determined to reinvigorate history there and made the university the leading centre in the England for historical study.

Powicke was the author of the volume The Thirteenth Century in the Oxford History of England.

In 1909, Powicke married Susan Irvine Martin, daughter of Anna and Thomas Martin Lindsay. Together they had two daughters. Their daughter Janet married the historian Richard Pares.

He died in the Radcliffe Infirmary in Oxford on 19 May 1963.

Works

 The Loss of Normandy 1189–1204: Studies in the History of the Angevin Empire (1913)
 Bismarck and the Origin of the German Empire (1914)
 Ailred of Rievaulx and his biographer Walter Daniel (1922)
 Stephen Langton (1927) Ford Lectures
 Gerald of Wales (1928)
 Historical Study at Oxford (1929) Inaugural lecture
 Robert Grosseteste and the Nicomachean Ethics (1930)
 Sir Henry Spelman and the 'Concilia'  (1930) Raleigh Lecture on History 
 The Medieval Books of Merton College (1931) A catalogue
 Oxford Essays in Medieval History. Presented to Herbert Edward Salter (1934) editor
The Christian Life in the Middle Ages (1935) essays
International Bibliography of Historical Sciences. Twelfth year (1937) editor
History, Freedom and Religion (1938) Riddell Memorial Lectures
Handbook of British Chronology (1939) editor
Three Lectures (1947)
King Henry III and the Lord Edward: the Community of the Realm in the Thirteenth Century (1947) 2 volumes (2nd ed., 1968)
Mediaeval England, 1066–1485 (1948)
Ways of Medieval Life and Thought: Essays and Addresses (1949)
Walteri Danielis: Vita Ailredi Abbatis Rievall: The Life of Ailred of Rievaulx by Walter Daniel (1950) editor
Oxford History of England – Thirteenth Century 1216 – 1307 (1953)
The Reformation in England (1953)
Modern Historians and the Study of History: Essays and Papers (London: Odhams Press, 1955)

Collaborations
 The Universities of Europe in the Middle Ages (3 vols) by Hastings Rashdall, editor with A. B. Emden
The Battle of Lewes 1264 (1964) with R. F. Treharne and Charles Lemmon
 The Administration of the Honor of Leicester in the Fourteenth Century (1940) with L. Fox
 Essays in Medieval History Presented to Thomas Frederick Tout (1925) editor with A. G. Little

Honours
Fellow of the British Academy, 1927
Corresponding Fellow of the Medieval Academy of America, 1929
Honorary Fellow of Balliol College, Oxford, 1939
Knight Bachelor, 1946
Honorary Fellow of Oriel College, Oxford, 1947
Hon. Member of Massachusetts Historical Society, 1947
Hon. Member of American Historical Association
Hon. Member of Royal Irish Academy, 1949
Hon. DLitt, Cambridge
Hon. DLitt, Durham
Hon. LLD, St Andrews
Hon. LLD, Glasgow
Hon. LittD, Manchester, Liverpool, Queen's University Belfast, London, and Harvard
Hon. Doctorate, University of Caen

References

Footnotes

Bibliography
Liber Memorialis Sir Maurice Powicke, Dublin 1963
Studies in Mediaeval History Presented to Frederick Maurice Powicke. (1969) edited by Richard William Hunt, William Abel Pantin and R. W. Southern
Inventing the Middle Ages by Norman Cantor
W. A. Pantin, "Frederick Maurice Powicke," The English Historical Review, 80, No. 314 (Jan. 1965): pp. 1–9.

External links 
 Chetham Society
 

English historians
1879 births
1963 deaths
Alumni of Balliol College, Oxford
Fellows of Merton College, Oxford
Presidents of the Royal Historical Society
Regius Professors of History (University of Oxford)
Knights Bachelor
Fellows of the British Academy
Corresponding Fellows of the Medieval Academy of America
Members of the Royal Irish Academy
Surtees Society
Chetham Society